The 2021 Atlanta United FC season was the fifth season of Atlanta United FC's existence, and the thirteenth year that a professional soccer club from Atlanta, Georgia competing in the top division of American soccer. Atlanta United played their home games at Mercedes-Benz Stadium. Outside of MLS, they will participate in the 2021 U.S. Open Cup as defending champions, as the previous year's tournament was canceled due to the COVID-19 pandemic. Due to the cancelation of the 2020 edition however, Atlanta United will compete in the 2021 CONCACAF Champions League as the final berth was given to the defending champions of the U.S. Open Cup.

Club

International roster slots 
Atlanta currently has ten International Roster Slots for use in the 2021 season. Matheus Rossetto obtained a green card in April 2021 to qualify as a domestic player for MLS roster purposes.

Results

Non-competitive

Friendlies

Competitive

Major League Soccer

League tables

Eastern Conference

Overall

Results summary

Results by round

Regular season

MLS Cup Playoffs

U.S. Open Cup

CONCACAF Champions League

Round of 16

Quarter-finals

Statistics

Appearances and goals

|-
! colspan=16 style=background:#dcdcdc; text-align:center|Goalkeepers

|-
! colspan=16 style=background:#dcdcdc; text-align:center|Defenders

|-
! colspan=16 style=background:#dcdcdc; text-align:center|Midfielders

|-
! colspan=16 style=background:#dcdcdc; text-align:center|Forwards

|-
! colspan=16 style=background:#dcdcdc; text-align:center|Players who have played for Atlanta United this season but have left the club:

|}

Top scorers

Player movement

In

Loan in

SuperDraft picks 
Draft picks are not automatically signed to the team roster. Only trades involving draft picks and executed after the start of 2021 MLS SuperDraft are listed in the notes. Atlanta have three selections in the draft.

Out

Loan Out

Non-player transfers

Honors

Weekly / monthly

MLS team / player / coach of the week

MLS goal of the week

References

Atlanta United FC seasons
Atlanta United
Atlanta United
Atlanta United FC
Atlanta